International Theory is an interdisciplinary peer-reviewed academic journal published triannually by Cambridge University Press for promoting theoretical scholarship about the positive, legal, and normative aspects of world politics. The publishers state that it is intended as a forum where scholars can develop theoretical arguments in depth without an expectation of extensive empirical analysis. It was established in 2009 by Duncan Snidal and Alexander Wendt, and edited by them along with Christian Reus-Smit until March 2019. The current editors-in-chief are Toni Erskine (Australian National University), Stefano Guzzini (Pontifical Catholic University of Rio de Janeiro and Uppsala University) and David A. Welch (Balsillie School of International Affairs, University of Waterloo).

According to the Journal Citation Reports, the journal has a 2019 2-year impact factor of 2.000, ranking it 53rd out of 181 journals in the category "Political Science" and 25th out of 95 journals in the category "International Relations", and a 5-year impact factor of 3.041, placing it 38th of 181 and 18th of 95 in these two categories respectively.

References

External links 
 Official website.

Cambridge University Press academic journals
English-language journals
International relations journals
Triannual journals
Publications established in 2009